Cryptocoryne spiralis is a plant species belonging to the Araceae genus Cryptocoryne.

Distribution
Endemic to India.

Leaf morphology
Leaves are lanceolate and extremely variable, some variations are red stems, furrows in leaf margins, pure green forms.

Inflorescence
The flower of C. spiralis is within a spathe which is curled clockwise, a distinctive feature of this species.

Rhizome
Cryotocorne sprialis stores nutrients in underground rhizome, during the dry season when the marshes dry out, plant survives by losing all its leaves and becoming dormant. Next season when the rains come the rhizome sprouts new leaves.

References

External links
Nonindigenous Aquatic Species USA

spiralis
Aquatic plants